Callicarpa longifolia is a species of beautyberry. It ranges from the Himalayas, east to Japan and south to Queensland. It is grown in yards and gardens as an ornamental plant. The roots are used as an herbal medicine to treat diarrheas.

References

External links
 Callicarpa info  Has info on Callicarpa longifolia

longifolia
Flora of Asia
Flora of Queensland
Flora of Papuasia
Plants described in 1785
Medicinal plants